Wadia Park is a multi purpose stadium in Ahmednagar, Maharashtra. The ground is mainly used for organizing matches of football, cricket and other sports.  The stadium hosted six first-class matches between 1957 and 1979. The first match was on 7 December 1957, where Maharashtra and Baroda played to a draw. The stadium has not hosted any top cricket matches since.

It is home to the Maharashtra District Sports Office.

There is also a running track, a swimming pool, a gymnastic hall, tennis courts, a basketball court and a badminton court, among others.

References

External links
 cricketarchive
 cricinfo

Sports venues in Maharashtra
Cricket grounds in Maharashtra
1957 establishments in Bombay State
Ahmednagar